Mademoiselle de Guise may refer to:

Mary of Guise (1515–1560) mother of Mary, Queen of Scots.
Catherine of Lorraine (1552–1596) daughter of Francis of Lorraine, Duke of Guise and Anne d'Este, wife of Louis, Duke of Montpensier.
Louise Marguerite of Lorraine (1588–1631) daughter of Henri, Duke of Guise and Catherine of Cleves, wife of François, Prince of Conti.
Marie of Lorraine, Duchess of Guise (1615–1688) daughter of Charles of Lorraine, Duke of Guise and Henriette Catherine de Joyeuse.
Louise Henriette Françoise of Lorraine (1707–1737) daughter of Anne, Count of Harcourt and Marie Louise Jeannin de Castille, wife of Emmanuel Théodose de La Tour d'Auvergne, Duke of Bouillon.